Paulo de Almeida Coelho, ComIH is a Paralympic track and field athlete from Portugal competing mainly in category T11 track running events.

He competed in the 1992 Summer Paralympics in Barcelona, Spain.  There he won a gold medal in the men's 1500 metres T11 event, a silver medal in the men's 4 x 400 metre relay T11-T13 event and a bronze medal in the men's 5000 metres T10 event.  He also competed at the 1996 Summer Paralympics in Atlanta, a gold medal in the men's 100 metres T13 event, a gold medal in the men's 5000 metres T10 event, a silver medal in the men's 5000 metres T10 event and finished sixteenth in the men's 10000 metres T10 event.  He also competed at the 2000 Summer Paralympics in Sydney, Australia, and a gold medal in the men's 1500 metres T11 event.  He competed in the 2004 Summer Paralympics in Athens, Greece.  There he finished fifth in the men's 1500 metres T11 event and finished seventh in the men's 5000 metres T10 event.

References

External links
 

Year of birth missing (living people)
Living people
Visually impaired long-distance runners
Portuguese male long-distance runners
Paralympic athletes of Portugal
Paralympic gold medalists for Portugal
Paralympic silver medalists for Portugal
Paralympic bronze medalists for Portugal
Athletes (track and field) at the 1992 Summer Paralympics
Athletes (track and field) at the 1996 Summer Paralympics
Athletes (track and field) at the 2000 Summer Paralympics
Athletes (track and field) at the 2004 Summer Paralympics
Medalists at the 1992 Summer Paralympics
Medalists at the 1996 Summer Paralympics
Medalists at the 2000 Summer Paralympics
Paralympic medalists in athletics (track and field)
Portuguese male middle-distance runners
Blind people
Portuguese people with disabilities